This is a list of the English-language television channels in Pakistan. This list contains the channels that are stationed in Pakistan by PEMRA and broadcast by almost all the cable operators.

List by category

Educational
 Animal Planet
 Discovery Channel
PTV Teleschool
 AGN Asian Gateway Network

Music
 8XM (airs some international music videos)

News
 BBC World News
 CNN
 DW-TV
 NHK World
 PTV World
 Indus News
 RT
 CGTN
 PT

Sports
 PTV Sports - Most of the content is in English language but some events/programmes are in Urdu language
 Geo Super - A few programmes are in English language

Kids
 Cartoon Network Pakistan
 Nickelodeon Pakistan
Pop Pakistan
Cinemachi Kids Pakistan
Champion TV Pakistan
Discovery Kids
Baby TV

Defunct
 Fashion TV
 HBO Pakistan
 WB Channel

See also
 List of television stations in Pakistan
 Television in Pakistan
 List of Pakistani radio channels

References

English